Minnewaska Hospital was a building in Starbuck, Minnesota on the National Register of Historic Places. When it was built in 1899–1900 for Dr. C. R. Christenson, it was the only hospital between Minneapolis and Fargo, North Dakota. It was demolished in January 2013 after standing vacant for more than a decade. It was removed from the National Register in January 2019.

See also
 National Register of Historic Places listings in Pope County, Minnesota

References

Buildings and structures in Pope County, Minnesota
Hospital buildings on the National Register of Historic Places in Minnesota
Former National Register of Historic Places in Minnesota
Demolished buildings and structures in Minnesota
Buildings and structures demolished in 2013